Pretty Bloody: The Women of Horror is a television documentary film that premiered on the Canadian cable network Space on February 25, 2009.

The hour-long documentary examines the experiences, motivations and impact of the increasing number of women engaged in horror fiction, with producers Donna Davies and Kimberlee McTaggart of Canada's Sorcery Films interviewing actresses, film directors, writers, critics and academics. The documentary was filmed in Toronto, Ontario, Canada; and in Los Angeles, California and New York City, New York in the United States.

Interview subjects include
 Cerina Vincent
 Elza Kephart
 Tanya Huff
 Mary Lambert
 Heidi Honeycutt (Etheria Film Night)
 Maitland McDonagh
 Debbie Rochon
 Katt Shea
 Brinke Stevens
 Karen Walton
 Jovanka Vuckovic

References

External links
Sorcery Films: Documentaries (official site)
Pretty-Scary.net

2009 television films
2009 films
Canadian documentary television films
English-language Canadian films
Documentary films about women in film
Documentary films about horror
Women in Ontario
Women in Los Angeles
Women in New York City
Documentary films about Hollywood, Los Angeles
2000s Canadian films